Groot (Legrand in French) is a Dutch surname. Groot means "big" in Dutch and was originally the name for a tall person. The name is most common in the province of North Holland. It may refer to:

Ana María Groot (born 1952), Colombian historian, archaeologist, and anthropologist
Anna Maria Groot (born 1952),  Dutch model, Miss Europe of 1973 
Cees Groot (1932–1988), Dutch footballer, brother of Henk
Chantal Groot (born 1982), Dutch swimmer
Cor Groot (1899–1978), Dutch Olympic sailor
Cornelia Groot (born 1988), Dutch team handball player
 (born 1990), Dutch pole vaulter
Ed Groot (born 1957), Dutch journalist and politician
Gerard Groot (1340–1384), Dutch Roman Catholic deacon, founder of the Brethren of the Common Life
Henk Groot (1938–2022), Dutch footballer, brother of Cees
Jacob Groot (1812–1893), Russian philologist
Marike Groot (born 1968), Dutch singer
Nycke Groot (born 1988), Dutch handball player
Roger Groot (1942–2005), American law professor
Tjade Groot (born 1973), Dutch cricketer

See also
De Groot

References

Dutch-language surnames